Oakland Coffee Works is a coffee company founded in 2015 by Billie Joe Armstrong, Tre Cool and Mike Dirnt of the rock band Green Day. The company aims to set a standard for compostability in coffee packaging. It is based in Oakland, California, United States.

In December 2015, the Financial Times named Oakland Coffee as the world's first US-based coffee company to exclusively sell fully compostable 12 oz. coffee bags and single-serve coffee cups. All of Oakland Coffee's bags, single-serve cups, and mother bags are Certified Compostable for municipal composting facilities by the Biodegradable Products Institute. Oakland Coffee only sells coffees that are organically grown, handpicked, and fairly traded. The beans are from small organic farms primarily in high altitude regions of Central and South America.

In the summer of 2020, Oakland Coffee launched a monthly subscription service, called The Oakland Coffee Club. Their service allows customers to receive coffee every month on an automatic shipping schedule. In late October/early November 2020, Oakland Coffee partnered with World Central Kitchen and the Chefs To The Polls Initiative to provide free coffee to poll workers and people waiting in line to vote leading up to and on Election Day.

Oakland Coffee announced their first Annual Holiday Bundle Series in November 2020. The collection includes a special edition pressing of Billie Joe Armstrong's No Fun Mondays 7" vinyl record, with "I Think We're Alone Now" and "War Stories". Every vinyl purchase provides five meals to families in need via the Alameda County Community Food Bank.

In October 2021, Oakland Coffee Works announced the release of a limited-edition seven-inch vinyl pressing with two tracks from Green Day's 1994 BBC Radio 1 “Evening Session” performance. The never-before-released vinyl features recordings of “Basket Case” and “When I Come Around” on a purple vinyl chosen by Green Day drummer Tre Cool.

References

External links
 

Coffee companies of the United States
Companies based in Oakland, California
American companies established in 2015
Food and drink companies established in 2015